Qozağacı (also, Kozagadzhi and Kozagadzhy) is a village and municipality in the Siazan Rayon of Azerbaijan.  It has a population of 378.

References 

Populated places in Siyazan District